The Home Depot Invitational was a golf tournament on the Champions Tour from 1983 to 2001. It was played in Charlotte, North Carolina at the Quail Hollow Club (1983-1989) and at the TPC at Piper Glen (1990-2001).

The purse for the 2001 tournament was US$1,300,000, with $195,000 going to the winner. The tournament was founded in 1983 as the World Seniors Invitational.

Winners
The Home Depot Invitational
2001 Bruce Fleisher
2000 Bruce Fleisher
1999 Bruce Fleisher
1998 Jim Dent
1997 Jim Dent

PaineWebber Invitational
1996 Graham Marsh
1995 Bob Murphy
1994 Lee Trevino
1993 Mike Hill
1992 Don Bies
1991 Orville Moody
1990 Bruce Crampton
1989 No tournament - canceled due to Hurricane Hugo.
1988 Dave Hill

PaineWebber World Seniors Invitational
1987 Gary Player
1986 Bruce Crampton
1985 Miller Barber

World Seniors Invitational
1984 Peter Thomson
1983 Doug Sanders

Source:

References

Former PGA Tour Champions events
Golf in North Carolina
Recurring sporting events established in 1983
Recurring sporting events disestablished in 2001
1983 establishments in North Carolina
2001 disestablishments in North Carolina